Mayonnaise is the name of Hypnotic Clambake's fifth full-length studio album. It was released in 2005 on Blue Button Records. The album showcases the musical talents of the band's lineup at the time. It also employs catchy, pop-format songs to explore a range of humorous topics. Typical of Hypnotic Clambake, the record wanders through a wide variety of musical genres, "from Middle Eastern spice to chill calypso style." Bandleader Maury Rosenberg collaborated heavily with guitarist/bassist Chris Reynolds on the record. Reynolds wrote several of the songs, including "500 Robots" and "Woe Is Me."

Track listing
(All songs by Hypnotic Clambake)
"500 Robots" – 3:13
"Trouble" – 3:56
"Psychedelic Polka" – 1:41
"Beans" – 3:56
"Windows" – 3:51
"Man With The Face On The Side" – 3:30
"The Scheme of Things" – 5:20
"Turn Your Brain Off" – 2:25
"Danger Mouse" – 7:49
"Just a Mountain" – 1:57
"Woe Is Me" – 3:15
"Clambake" – 4:45

References

External links
Official Hypnotic Clambake website

2005 albums